Rudy Simone (pen name, Artemisia) is an American author of books on Asperger's Syndrome.

Interviews and appearances
She has been interviewed by The New York Times, TIME and the Australian Broadcasting Corporation.

Rudy has lectured at autism and Asperger conferences in Britain.

Published books
Her books have been translated into several languages.

22 Things a Woman Must Know if She loves a Man with Asperger's Syndrome (Jessica Kingsley Publishers, 2009) 
22 Things A Woman with Asperger's Wants her Partner to Know (Jessica Kingsley Publisher, 2012) 
Asperger's on the Job Must-have Advice for People with Asperger's or High Functioning Autism, and their Employers, Educators, and Advocates (Future Horizons Publishing, 2010) 
Aspergirls: Empowering Females with Asperger's Syndrome (Jessica Kingsley Publishers, 2010) 
 Orsath, an epic fantasy (2013)
The A-Z of ASDs: Aunt Aspie’s Guide to Life (Jessica Kingsley Publishers, 2016)
Sex and the Single Aspie (Jessica Kingsley, 2018) written under the name Artemisia 
She has also penned the forewords to Asperger's in Pink and The Aspie Teen Survival Guide.

Self-identification 

In 2011 Simone told Time Magazine that she initially self diagnosed with Aspergers after failing to find a doctor within 500 miles of where she lived who would believe her.
In a December 2014 blog Simone wrote that between her writing and treatment as well as dietary changes, her symptoms had diminished to the point she did not feel she qualified as a person on the spectrum. However, she later stated she still considers herself to be autistic, and most recently has been working in France to reform the treatment of people with autism in that country.

On August 12, 2016, she gave an interview on the Everyday Aspie website where she explained that her self-diagnosis was not officially confirmed and she did not feel the need to be evaluated.

She changed her name in 2017 and now publishes under the pseudonym Artemisia.

Awards
Aspergirls won a Gold Award from the Independent Publishers Group in 2011, and Asperger's on the Job won Honorable Mention in ForeWord magazine's 2010 Book of the Year Awards.

References

External links 

Autism/Asperger website: Rudy Simone
International Aspergirl® Society

Living people
Year of birth missing (living people)
American self-help writers
Autism activists
Writers from New York (state)
21st-century American women writers
21st-century American non-fiction writers
American women non-fiction writers